Harrison Township is one of the thirteen townships of Henry County, Ohio, United States. As of the 2010 census the population was 1,327, of whom 1,025 lived in the unincorporated portion of the township.

Geography
Located in the central part of the county, it borders the following townships:
Liberty Township - north
Washington Township - northeast corner
Damascus Township - east
Richfield Township - southeast corner
Monroe Township - south
Flatrock Township - southwest corner
Napoleon Township - west
Freedom Township - northwest corner

Harrison Township is one of only two townships in the county without a border on another county.

A small part of the county seat of Napoleon is located in northwestern Harrison Township.

Name and history
It is one of nineteen Harrison Townships statewide.

Government
The township is governed by a three-member board of trustees, who are elected in November of odd-numbered years to a four-year term beginning on the following January 1. Two are elected in the year after the presidential election and one is elected in the year before it. There is also an elected township fiscal officer, who serves a four-year term beginning on April 1 of the year after the election, which is held in November of the year before the presidential election. Vacancies in the fiscal officership or on the board of trustees are filled by the remaining trustees.

References

External links
County website

Townships in Henry County, Ohio
Townships in Ohio